Stefano Piccinini (born 31 December 2002) is an Italian professional footballer who plays as a defender for  club Pergolettese, on loan from Sassuolo.

Career 
On 22 May 2020 he signed his first professional contract for Sassuolo. On 2 August 2020 he made his Serie A debut against Udinese.

On 17 July 2021, he was loaned to Serie C club Vis Pesaro. On 4 August 2022, Piccinini moved on a new loan to Pergolettese.

Personal life
His older brother Gabriele Piccinini is also a football player.

Club statistics

Club

Notes

References

2002 births
Living people
Sportspeople from Reggio Emilia
Italian footballers
Association football defenders
Serie A players
Serie C players
A.C. Reggiana 1919 players
U.S. Sassuolo Calcio players
Vis Pesaro dal 1898 players
U.S. Pergolettese 1932 players
Italy youth international footballers
Footballers from Emilia-Romagna